"Encoded" is an instrumental composition by Dutch DJ and music producer Hardwell. It was released on 2 May 2011 by Revealed Recordings in the Netherlands. It is the second single from Hardwell's compilation, Hardwell Presents Revealed Volume 2. It was the soundtrack of the introduction for every Hardwell On Air radio show episodes.

Critical review 
10 years after the release of the track, Jake Gable from webmedia We Rave You thinks that "Encoded" is "one of [Hardwell's] biggest hits of all time".

Music video 
A music video for the song was published on 18 April 2011 by Hardwell's Youtube channel.

Track listing 
Netherlands - Digital download - Revealed (REVR011)
 "Encoded" (Original Mix) – 6:34
 "Encoded" (Dada Life Remix) – 5:15

Netherlands - CD - Revealed (REVR011)
 "Encoded" (Radio Edit) – 3:25
 "Encoded" (Original Mix) – 6:34

Charts

References 

2011 songs
2011 singles
Hardwell songs
Songs written by Hardwell